Riccardo Pellegrini (Milan, 1863–1934) was an Italian painter.

He completed many landscapes and scenes from his travels in Spain and France.  He exhibited rarely, but sent to Milan, in 1883, works that aroused curiosity. Among his works are: Nel mercato Jerez; Sur la promenade des Anglais; Notes of Spain: Remembrance of Seville; Remembrance of my nation: El picador; Premier Espada: View of Seville; Spaniard Prototype, and A Bullfighter.

References

19th-century Italian painters
Italian male painters
20th-century Italian painters
1863 births
1934 deaths
Painters from Milan
Italian genre painters
19th-century Italian male artists
20th-century Italian male artists